Johann Heinrich Alfred Escher vom Glas, known as Alfred Escher (20 February 1819 – 6 December 1882) was a Swiss politician, business leader and railways pioneer. Thanks to his numerous political posts and his significant role in the foundation and management of the Swiss Northeastern Railway, the Swiss Federal Institute of Technology, Credit Suisse, Swiss Life and the Gotthard Railway, Escher had an unmatched influence on Switzerland's political and economic development in the 19th century. Escher served on the National Council (Switzerland) from 1848 to 1882 for the Free Radical Liberals.

Life

Origins and family 

Alfred Escher was born in Zürich, into the Escher vom Glas family, an old and influential dynasty that had produced many prominent politicians. A scandal surrounding Alfred Escher's immediate forebears had, however, damaged his family line's reputation. His great-grandfather Hans Caspar Escher-Werdmüller (1731–1781) had fathered a child out of wedlock with a maidservant in 1765 and emigrated. His grandfather Hans Caspar Escher-Keller (1755–1831) almost brought the whole of Zürich to financial ruin when he went bankrupt.
Finally Alfred Escher's father Heinrich Escher (1776–1853) made a new fortune through speculative land deals and trading in partnership with Baron Jean-Conrad Hottinguer from their North American offices. In 1814 Heinrich returned to Zürich and married Lydia Zollikofer (1797–1868) in May 1815. The marriage produced two children, Clementine (1816–1886) and Alfred. In 1857 Alfred Escher married Augusta Uebel (1838–1864). Their daughter Lydia was born in 1858, but another daughter Hedwig (1861–1862) died while still a baby. In 1883 Lydia Escher married Friedrich Emil Welti, the son of Federal Councillor Emil Welti. In 1890, shortly before the end of her tragic life, she invested the Escher fortune in a Foundation which she called the Gottfried Keller Foundation after the Zürich writer to whom her father gave consistent support. Lydia's suicide in 1891 brought an end to Alfred Escher's family line.

His family owned a coffee plantation in Cuba between 1815 and 1845 that employed slaves.

Childhood, youth, student years 
Alfred Escher spent the first years of his childhood in the house where he was born, the "Neuberg" on Hirschengraben in Zürich. Heinrich Escher had a country house built on the left shore of Lake Zürich in the village of Enge (now part of the city of Zürich). He called it Belvoir. When the family moved into the house in 1831, Heinrich Escher was able to devote himself fully to his passion for botany and his entomological collection. During this period Alfred Escher was taught at home by various tutors, including the theologian Alexander Schweizer, and Oswald Heer, who was to become a paleo-botanist and entomologist. Escher attended the Zürich Obergymnasium high school from 1835 to 1837. After graduating from high school, Escher decided to study law at the University of Zürich. In 1838/39 he spent two semesters abroad at the Universities of Bonn and Berlin, though these stays were marred by serious illness. During his studies, Escher became involved in the Zofingia student society, which he joined in 1837. He served as president of the society's Zürich section in 1839/40 and in September 1840 became overall president of the whole society. Escher himself repeatedly cited the Zofingia as a major influence on the development of his personality. With a dissertation on Roman law, Escher gained his doctorate "summa cum laude" from the University of Zürich. Having completed his studies, Escher needed to think carefully about his future career, so he went to Paris for several months to contemplate the matter.

Political rise 
Following his return to Zürich in the summer of 1843 Escher devoted himself to a number of academic projects. He did preparatory work on a wide-ranging history of Swiss law, which never came to fruition. Escher also planned to give lectures at the University of Zürich, Switzerland. In February 1844 he gave a trial lecture, whereupon the university governing council appointed him as a lecturer in the Faculty of Political Science.
In addition to his academic pursuits, the radical-liberal Escher was politically active: he met regularly with former student friends in the "Academic Wednesday Society" to discuss topical political issues and wrote a number of articles for the Neue Zürcher Zeitung. In August 1844 Escher, now 25 years old, was elected to the Zürich's Cantonal Parliament. He was now able to play an active part in political debates of the time, most notably the expulsion of the Jesuits from the Swiss Confederation, a position on which Escher played a prominent role in the anti-Jesuit camp. In 1845 and 1846 Escher took part in the Federal Council of Cantonal Representatives (Tagsatzung) in Zürich as Third Envoy, which brought him into contact with Switzerland's leading politicians. In 1847 Escher was appointed as Zürich's Chief Administrator, and in the summer of 1848 he was elected to the cantonal government. With the introduction of the new Swiss Federal Constitution, it became necessary to put together the first ever national parliament. On 15 October 1848 Escher was elected to the National Council and was appointed its vice-president on 7 November 1848. Escher was to sit on the National Council without interruption until his death 34 years later. He was elected to serve as National Council President (the highest public office in Switzerland) four times (in 1849, 1856 and 1862: in 1855 Escher declined the post for health reasons).

Opposition and criticism 
Thanks to his many political posts and his position as one of the founders of the Swiss Northeastern Railway (1852/53) and Credit Suisse (1856), Escher commanded an unusual amount of power. He attracted a number of nicknames as a result, including "King Alfred I" or the "Princeps". His political eminence was bound to attract critics. The Democratic Movement called for the people to be given a greater say on political issues. The devotees who surrounded Alfred Escher – known as the "Escher system" – were the avowed enemies of the Democrats. The fight was taken to the "Escher system" by means of pamphlets and public assemblies, and ultimately this resulted in a weakening of Escher's influence.
Another serious problem he faced was the fact that his Northeastern Railway was sliding further and further into financial crisis in the 1870s. The company's share price plummeted from 658 Swiss francs in 1868 to 70 francs in 1877. This process prompted irate investors to heap criticism on Alfred Escher, even though he had already resigned from his position as chairman of the Northeastern Railway board in 1871. Even the financial difficulties involved in the Gotthard project were blamed on Escher by various parties.

Illness, death and memorial 

In addition to personal attacks from political opponents, Escher faced serious health problems. He suffered repeated bouts of ill health throughout his life and on many occasions was obliged to spend long periods in convalescence. His susceptibility to illness was highly incompatible with his phenomenal appetite for work. During the critical phase of the Gotthard Tunnel construction in the mid-1870s Escher nearly worked himself to death. In 1878 he fell so badly ill that he was unable to leave "Belvoir" for several weeks. His life became a constant alternation between illness and recovery: asthma, fever, eye conditions, boils. However, this did not prevent Escher from fulfilling his political and business obligations whenever he could. In late November 1882 he fell badly ill again. Carbuncles developed on his back and he was plagued by a virulent fever. On the morning of 6 December 1882 Alfred Escher died on his "Belvoir" estate at Zürich/Enge.
At his funeral service on 9 December 1882, which was held in Zürich's Fraumünster church, the Swiss political elite conferred the last honour on him: Federal Councillors, National and States Councillors as well as countless representatives of the Cantons were in attendance. In February 1883 a committee was formed for the purpose of erecting a memorial statue to Escher. The commission went to the sculptor Richard Kissling. The Alfred Escher memorial designed by Kissling and erected outside the Zürich main railway station was inaugurated on 22 June 1889. Alfred Escher was initially buried in the Enge cemetery, but when that was deconsecrated in 1925 his remains were moved to the Manegg cemetery.

Founder of modern Switzerland

First railway projects 

"The rail tracks are approaching Switzerland, moving nearer on all sides. People are coming up with plans to route the railways around Switzerland. There is thus a danger that Switzerland will be entirely circumvented and that, in the future, it will be left with no option but to present to the world the sad face of Europe's forgotten backwater." With these words uttered in late 1849 Alfred Escher expressed his concern that modernity risked passing Switzerland by. And he had good cause for such concern, since at the time when the distances covered by railway tracks in Europe were steadily increasing, driving economic development as they did, Switzerland was doing little to join in. The fate of the new Swiss Confederation established in 1848 became inextricably bound up with the advent of the railways. There was basic agreement on the need for railways, but precious little agreement on how or where they should be built. In 1852 Escher helped push through a railway law drafted entirely in line with his own conceptions: railway construction and operation would be left to private companies. This soon led to a veritable railway boom in Switzerland. Within a very short period of time competing railway companies were set up, including in 1852–53 the Swiss Northeastern Railway, with Escher at its helm. In this way the Swiss rapidly closed the gap in rail-related knowledge and technology between themselves and foreign operators.

Federal Polytechnic Institute 
The railway boom was accompanied by a call for people with the technical training required in the new economic sector. In Switzerland there were then no educational establishments for engineers and technicians. Escher was at the forefront of the struggle to rise to the technological and manufacturing challenges of the time. After years of political wrangling the Federal Polytechnic Institute (now known as ETH Zurich) was finally founded in 1854/55. From 1854 to 1882 Escher was vice-chairman of the Federal School Council, the governing body of the Polytechnic Institute. The establishment of this institution for technology and the natural sciences was the key act in laying the foundation for Switzerland's later pre-eminence in education and research.

Credit Suisse 
The large amounts of capital involved in constructing railways posed new challenges to the rail companies. The capital had to be raised outside Switzerland because there were no institutions within the country able to make money available in the huge quantities required. This dependence on foreign lenders resulted in those lenders seeking to influence the growth and development of the Swiss rail companies. Alfred Escher did not like this state of affairs. In 1856 he succeeded in establishing a new bank, Schweizerische Kreditanstalt (now known as Credit Suisse), primarily for the purpose of securing financing for his own rail company, the Swiss Northeastern Railway. Increasingly, however, Escher's bank financed other public and private sector endeavours too, thereby developing into an important lender for the Swiss economy and the founding institution of the Zürich's financial centre.

Gotthard railway 
Despite the expansion of the rail network in the 1850s, there was still a danger that Switzerland would be left out of the wider European scheme of things. Although connections with the main Swiss towns and cities had soon been established, there was still no major north–south route. Alfred Escher initially favoured a trans-Alpine link via the Lukmanier, he changed his mind and became an advocate of the Gotthard project. Escher threw all the economic and political resources at his command behind this ambitious project. He consulted engineers and other experts, and conducted negotiations with the authorities at home and abroad. At the international Gotthard conference held in the autumn of 1869, the final decision was made in favour of the Gotthard line. In 1871 the Gotthardbahn-Gesellschaft (Gotthard Railway Company) was established, with Escher as its chairman. The construction phase was hampered by a variety of problems in realising the project and a – given the scale of the project, rather modest – budget overrun of around 11%. Escher was exposed to increasingly vociferous criticism, prompting him to resign as chairman of the Gotthard Rail Company in 1878. When the builders of the Gotthard tunnel broke through in 1880, he was not invited to attend. In 1882 this landmark project was finally completed and the Gotthard tunnel was ceremoniously opened. This time, Escher was invited but unable to attend the opening celebrations because of his poor health. The Gotthard tunnel played a vital part in putting Switzerland on the international transport map. In the years following its inauguration the volume of goods and passengers passing through soared, turning Switzerland into an important transit country.

Public offices and positions 
The number and importance of the positions and public offices held by Alfred Escher remains unparalleled in Swiss history to date, as the following (not exhaustive) list illustrates:

Legacy and research 
Those wishing to research Alfred Escher have a rich store of source material at their disposal. First and foremost there is extensive correspondence connected with Escher. Escher corresponded with a number of eminent personages from the worlds of politics, industry and science. In 2006 the Alfred Escher Foundation was set up to conduct research into his life and achievements. The Alfred Escher Foundation's documentation centre can provide photocopies of the approximately 7,500 letters written to or by Alfred Escher as well as a range of standard reference works on Swiss history in the 19th century. The correspondence is also available in a multimedia edition, which is being posted online in stages.

Escher's correspondence 
 
 
 
 
 
 The series is to be continued (to a total of six volumes).

References

Bibliography 
 
 
  4 volumes.

External links 

 
 Alfred Escher Foundation
 Digital edition of Alfred Escher's correspondence
 Alfred Escher Superman (Documentary 2007, German)

1819 births
1882 deaths
Politicians from Zürich
Businesspeople from Zürich
Swiss Calvinist and Reformed Christians
Members of the National Council (Switzerland)
Presidents of the National Council (Switzerland)
Swiss railway pioneers
Swiss railway entrepreneurs
Credit Suisse people
19th-century Swiss businesspeople
19th-century Swiss politicians
Swiss Life